Noravar is a village and municipality in the Yardymli Rayon of Azerbaijan.  The municipality consists of the villages of Noravar and Əngəvül

References

Populated places in Yardimli District